HD 4391 is a triple star system in the constellation Phoenix that is located at a distance of 48.7 light years from the Sun. The primary has a stellar classification of G3V, which is a G-type main sequence star. The physical properties of this star are similar to the Sun, making it a solar analog. However, it is believed to have 22% greater mass than the Sun and is only 1.2 billion years old. The spectrum for this star displays an abnormally low level of beryllium, which may be the result of some form of mixing process.

No planet has been detected in orbit around this star, nor does it emit a statistically significant excess of infrared radiation that might indicate a debris disk. However, it has two companions that share a common proper motion through space with HD 4391, effectively making it a triple star system. The first, a red dwarf of type M4, lies at an angular separation of 17″ from the primary. The second is a type M5 star at a separation of 49″.

References

Phoenix (constellation)
Triple star systems
G-type main-sequence stars
HD, 004391
004391
003583
1021
Durchmusterung objects
0209